Keijo Manni (born 3 April 1951) is a Finnish wrestler. He competed at the 1976 Summer Olympics and the 1980 Summer Olympics.

References

1951 births
Living people
Finnish male sport wrestlers
Olympic wrestlers of Finland
Wrestlers at the 1976 Summer Olympics
Wrestlers at the 1980 Summer Olympics